The 1969 SCCA Continental Championship was the third annual running of the Sports Car Club of America's professional open wheel racing series. It was the first to carry the SCCA Continental Championship name as the previous two series had both been staged as the Grand Prix Championship. 

The 1969 championship was open only to Formula A cars. Formula B and Formula C cars, which had competed with the Formula A cars in the previous two championships, were now given their own races at each event and competed for separate points.

Race results
The 1969 SCCA Continental Championship was contested over thirteen events.

Points system
Championship points were awarded to drivers on a 9-6-4-3-2-1 basis for the first six places in each race.

Championship results

References

External links
 US Formula 5000 races 1968-1976, www.oldracingcars.com
 Formula A/F5000 programs, www.myf5000.com

SCCA Continental Championship
Formula A (SCCA)
Formula 5000